This is a list of franchise records for the New York Rangers of the National Hockey League.

Bold indicates active and updated as of 2019-20 regular season.

Team records

Single season

All-time regular season leaders

Most goals
Rod Gilbert - 406
Jean Ratelle – 336
Adam Graves – 280
Andy Bathgate – 272
Vic Hadfield – 262
Camille Henry – 256
Chris Kreider - 251
Mark Messier – 250
Steve Vickers – 246
Brian Leetch – 240
Bill Cook – 229

Most points
Rod Gilbert – 1021
Brian Leetch – 981
Jean Ratelle – 817
Andy Bathgate – 729
Mark Messier – 691
Walt Tkaczuk – 678
Ron Greschner – 610
Steve Vickers – 586
Vic Hadfield – 572
Adam Graves – 507

Most assists
Brian Leetch – 741
Rod Gilbert – 615
Jean Ratelle – 481
Andy Bathgate – 457
Walt Tkaczuk – 451
Mark Messier – 441
Ron Greschner – 431
James Patrick – 363
Steve Vickers – 340
Vic Hadfield – 310

Most power play goals*
Camille Henry – 116
Rod Gilbert – 108
Brian Leetch – 106
Adam Graves – 100
Chris Kreider - 84
Vic Hadfield – 83
Phil Esposito – 82
Jean Ratelle – 82
Mark Messier – 72
Steve Vickers – 69

Most power play points
Brian Leetch – 514
Rod Gilbert – 323
James Patrick – 237
Mark Messier – 232
Jean Ratelle – 223
Ron Greschner – 222
Andy Bathgate – 221
Camille Henry – 210
Steve Vickers – 168
Adam Graves – 165
Vic Hadfield – 165

Most power play assists
Brian Leetch – 408
Rod Gilbert – 215
James Patrick – 187
Ron Greschner – 171
Andy Bathgate – 162
Mark Messier – 160
Jean Ratelle – 141
Brad Park – 101
Steve Vickers – 99
Bill Gadsby – 96

Most even strength goals*
Rod Gilbert – 298
Jean Ratelle – 252
Andy Bathgate – 207
Vic Hadfield – 179
Steve Vickers – 176
Walt Tkaczuk – 175
Adam Graves – 164
Bryan Hextall Sr. – 160
Mark Messier – 155
Dean Prentice – 148

Most even strength points
Rod Gilbert – 698 
Jean Ratelle – 592
Walt Tkaczuk – 535
Andy Bathgate – 499
Brian Leetch – 446
Steve Vickers – 416
Mark Messier – 408
Vic Hadfield – 407
Ron Greschner – 377
Don Maloney – 366

Most even strength assists
Rod Gilbert – 400
Walt Tkaczuk – 360
Jean Ratelle – 340
Brian Leetch – 320
Andy Bathgate – 292
Ron Greschner – 255
Mark Messier – 253
Steve Vickers – 240
Don Maloney – 235
Vic Hadfield – 228

Most short-handed goals*
Mark Messier – 23
Adam Graves – 16
Don Maloney – 14
Bill Fairbairn – 12
Walt Tkaczuk – 11
Mike Rogers – 10
Cecil Dillon – 10
Ron Duguay – 10
Ron Stewart – 8
Rick Nash – 8
Petr Nedved – 8
Jan Erixon – 8
Brian Leetch – 8
Mika Zibanejad – 8

Most short-handed points*
Mark Messier – 51
Walt Tkaczuk – 29
Adam Graves – 27
Don Maloney – 21
Brian Leetch – 21
Bill Fairbairn – 17
Mika Zibanejad – 17
Jan Erixon – 17
Derek Stepan – 16
Mike Rogers – 15
Kevin Hayes – 13
Neil Colville – 13
Petr Nedved – 13
Phil Watson – 13

Most short-handed assists*
Mats Zuccarello – 28
Walt Tkaczuk –18
Brian Leetch – 13
Adam Graves – 11
James Patrick – 10
Dan Girardi – 10
Derek Stepan – 9
Jan Erixon – 9
Marc Staal – 9Mika Zibanejad – 9Barry Beck – 8
Ryan McDonagh – 8

Most game-winning goals
Mats Zuccarello – 52
Jean Ratelle – 46
Bill Cook – 42
Mark Messier – 41
Vic Hadfield – 40
Brian Leetch – 37
Adam Graves – 36
Steve Vickers – 35Chris Kreider - 34Camille Henry – 32

Most overtime goals
Mats Zuccarello – 7
Brian Leetch – 7
Cecil Dillon – 7Mika Zibanejad – 6Theoren Fleury – 5
Marian Gaborik – 5
Bill Cook – 5
Frank Boucher – 5
Adam Graves – 5
J.T. Miller – 4
Tomas Sandstrom – 4
Bryan Hextall Sr. – 4
Ryan Callahan – 4
Butch Keeling – 4

Most empty net goals
Michael Grabner – 11
Mark Messier –11
Rick Nash – 10
Ryan Callahan – 9
Ryan Strome – 8
Carl Hagelin – 6
John Ogrodnick – 6
Brandon Dubinsky – 6
Adam Graves – 6
Marian Gaborik – 5
Pavel Buchnevich – 5Mika Zibanejad – 5J.T. Miller – 5
Derek Stepan – 5
Andy Bathgate – 5
Jean Ratelle – 5

Most penalty minutes
Ron Greschner – 1226
Jeff Beukeboom – 1157
Harry Howell – 1147
Dave Maloney – 1113
Vic Hadfield – 1041
Nick Fotiu – 970
Lou Fontinato – 940
Ivan "Ching" Johnson – 826
Adam Graves – 810
Barry Beck – 775

Most penalties taken
Harry Howell – 555
Ron Greschner – 477
Dave Maloney – 440
Vic Hadfield – 400
Ivan "Ching" Johnson – 398
Jeff Beukeboom – 397
Lou Fontinato – 364
Jim Neilson – 338
Adam Graves – 326
Jack Evans – 311

Most games played
Harry Howell – 1160
Brian Leetch – 1129
Rod Gilbert – 1065
Ron Greschner – 981
Walt Tkaczuk – 945
Marc Staal – 892
Henrik Lundqvist – 887
Jean Ratelle – 861
Vic Hadfield – 841
Jim Neilson – 811

Most hat-tricks
Bill Cook – 9
Rod Gilbert – 7Mika Zibanejad — 7Phil Esposito – 6
Petr Nedved – 6
Frank Boucher – 6
Camille Henry – 6
Steve Vickers – 6
Mark Messier – 6
Jean Ratelle – 6

Most wins by a goaltender
Henrik Lundqvist – 459
Mike Richter – 301
Eddie Giacomin – 266
Gump Worsley – 204
John Vanbiesbrouck – 200
Dave Kerr – 157
Chuck Rayner – 123
Gilles Villemure – 98
John Davidson – 93Igor Shesterkin – 86

Most shutouts by a goaltender
Henrik Lundqvist – 64
Eddie Giacomin – 49
Dave Kerr – 40
John Ross Roach – 30
Mike Richter – 24
Gump Worsley – 24
Chuck Rayner – 24
Lorne Chabot – 21
John Vanbiesbrouck – 16
Gilles Villemure – 13

Coaching

All-time playoff leaders

Most goals
Rod Gilbert – 34Chris Kreider – 34 
Mark Messier – 29
Adam Graves – 28
Ron Duguay – 28
Brian Leetch – 28
Steve Vickers – 24
Anders Hedberg – 22
Vic Hadfield – 22
Don Maloney – 22

Most points
Brian Leetch – 89
Mark Messier – 80
Rod Gilbert – 67
Don Maloney – 57
Walt Tkaczuk – 51
Steve Vickers – 49
Ron Greschner – 49
Derek Stepan – 49
Ron Duguay – 47
Anders Hedberg – 46

Most assists
Brian Leetch – 61
Mark Messier – 51
Don Maloney – 35
Jean Ratelle – 33
Rod Gilbert – 33
Brad Park – 32
Ron Greschner – 32
Walt Tkaczuk – 32
Ryan McDonagh – 31
Derek Stepan – 30

Most power play goals*
Adam Graves – 13
Brian Leetch – 12
Rod Gilbert – 11Chris Kreider – 9Mike Gartner – 8
Mark Messier – 8
Ron Greschner – 7
Pierre Larouche – 6
Brad Park – 6
Derek Stepan – 6

Most power play points
Brian Leetch – 46
Mark Messier – 30
Brad Park – 21
Adam Graves – 21
Ron Greschner – 21
James Patrick – 20
Rod Gilbert – 19
Don Maloney – 17
Sergei Zubov – 16
Derek Stepan – 16

Most power play assists
Brian Leetch – 34
Mark Messier – 22
James Patrick – 17
Brad Park – 15
Ron Greschner – 14
Sergei Zubov – 13
Don Maloney – 12
Bobby Rousseau – 10
Derick Brassard – 10
Derek Stepan – 10

Most even strength goals*
Rod Gilbert – 23
Ron Duguay – 21
Steve Vickers – 20
Vic Hadfield – 18
Mark Messier – 18
Anders Hedberg – 17
Don Maloney – 17
Pete Stemkowski – 16
Walt Tkaczuk – 16
Derick Brassard – 15
Adam Graves – 15Chris Kreider – 15Brian Leetch – 15

Most even strength points
Rod Gilbert – 48
Mark Messier – 45
Brian Leetch – 41
Steve Vickers – 40
Walt Tkaczuk – 40
Don Maloney – 39
Ron Duguay – 36
Vic Hadfield – 32
Derek Stepan – 32
Pete Stemkowski – 31
Derick Brassard – 31

Most even strength assists
Mark Messier – 27
Brian Leetch – 26
Rod Gilbert – 25
Jean Ratelle – 24
Walt Tkaczuk – 24
Don Maloney – 22
Dan Girardi – 22
Ryan McDonagh – 21
Steve Vickers – 20
Rick Nash – 20
Derek Stepan – 20

Most game-winning goals
Mark Messier – 7
Bill Cook – 6
Frank Boucher – 6Chris Kreider – 6Brian Leetch – 6
Adam Graves – 5
Rod Gilbert – 5
Dave Balon – 4
Kris King – 4
Esa Tikkanen – 4
Alex Shibicky – 4
Pete Stemkowski – 4
Derick Brassard – 4
Walt Tkaczuk – 4

Most penalty minutes
Ivan "Ching" Johnson – 150
Jeff Beukeboom – 147
Ed Hospodar – 135
Brad Park – 129
Walt Tkaczuk – 119
Vic Hadfield – 106
Ron Greschner – 106
Ron Duguay – 103
Ted Irvine – 102
Troy Mallette – 99

Most penalties taken
Ivan "Ching" Johnson – 75
Jeff Beukeboom – 55
Walt Tkaczuk – 48
Ron Greschner – 46
Brad Park – 42
Dave Maloney – 41
Vic Hadfield – 36
Mike Allison – 39
Ted Irvine – 35
Don Maloney – 35

Most games played
Henrik Lundqvist – 130
Dan Girardi – 122
Marc Staal – 107
Derek Stepan – 97
Ryan McDonagh – 96
Walt Tkaczuk – 93
Don Maloney – 85
Ron Greschner – 84
Brian Leetch – 82Chris Kreider – 80Most wins by a goaltender
Henrik Lundqvist – 61
Mike Richter – 41
Eddie Giacomin – 29
Dave Kerr – 17
John Davidson – 16
John Vanbiesbrouck – 13
Eddie Mio – 9
Chuck Rayner – 9
John Ross Roach – 9
Steve Baker – 7

Most shutouts by a goaltender
Henrik Lundqvist – 10
Mike Richter – 9
Dave Kerr – 7
John Ross Roach – 5
Andy Aitkenhead – 3
Lorne Chabot – 2
John Vanbiesbrouck – 2
Joe Miller – 1
Jim Henry – 1
Glen Hanlon – 1
Chuck Rayner – 1
John Davidson – 1
Eddie Giacomin – 1

Single-season leaders

Most goals

Most points

Most assists

Most power play goals

Most power play points

Most power play assists

Most even strength goals

Most even strength points

Most even strength assists

Most rookie goals

Most rookie points

Most rookie assists

Most shots on goal

Most penalty minutes

Most penalties taken

Single-season records by position
Defensemen
 Points by a defenseman: Brian Leetch (1991–92) – 102
 Goals by a defenseman: Reijo Ruotsalainen (1984–85) – 28
 Power play goals by a defenseman: Brian Leetch (1993–94) – 17
 Even strength goals by a defenseman: Brad Park (1973–74) & Ron Greschner (1980–81) – 21
 Even strength points by a defenseman: Brian Leetch (1991–92) – 55
 Even strength assists by a defenseman: Brian Leetch (1991–92) – 44
 Short-handed goals by a defenseman: Brian Leetch (1988–89) & Ryan McDonagh (2013–14) – 3
 Short-handed points by a defenseman: Brian Leetch (2000–01) – 5
 Short-handed assists by a defenseman: James Patrick (1986–87) & Brian Leetch (2000–01) – 4
 Game-winning goals by a defenseman: Ron Greschner (1977–78) & Tom Poti (2003–04) – 5
 Overtime goals by a defenseman: Brian Leetch (2001–02), Tom Poti (2003–04), Kevin Klein (2014–15), & Tony DeAngelo (2019–20) – 2
 Empty net goals by a defenseman: Ron Greschner (1985–86), James Patrick (1991–92), & Ryan McDonagh (2013–14) – 2
 Shots on goal by a defenseman: Brian Leetch (1993–94) – 328
 Penalty minutes by a defenseman: Barry Beck (1980–81) – 231

Forwards
 Assists by a forward: [Artemi Panarin] (2021-2022) - 74
 Power play points by a forward: Jaromir Jagr (2005–06) – 52
 Power play assists by a forward: Jaromir Jagr (2006–07) – 34
 Plus/minus by a forward: Jean Ratelle (1971–72) – +61
 Penalties taken by a forward: Troy Mallette (1989–90) – 85

Rookies
 Power play goals by a rookie: Camille Henry (1953–54) – 20
 Power play points by a rookie: Camille Henry (1953–54) – 32
 Power play assists by a rookie: Brian Leetch (1988–89) – 23
 Even strength goals by a rookie: Steve Vickers (1972–73) & Tony Granato (1988–89) – 28
 Even strength points by a rookie: Mark Pavelich (1981–82) & Tony Amonte (1991–92) – 52
 Even strength assists by a rookie: Mark Pavelich (1981–82) – 34
 Short-handed goals by a rookie: Tony Granato (1988–89) – 4
 Short-handed points by a rookie: Tony Granato (1988–89) – 5
 Short-handed assists by a rookie: Mark Heaslip (1977–78) & Ryan McDonagh (2010–11) – 2
 Game-winning goals by a rookie: Bill Cook (1926–27) & Camille Henry (1953–54) – 7
 Empty net goals by a rookie: Don Murdoch (1976–77), Mark Pavelich (1981–82), Tony Granato (1988-89), & Dominic Moore (2005–06) – 2
 Plus/minus by a rookie: Steve Vickers (1972–73) – +35
 Shots on goal by a rookie: Brian Leetch (1988–89) – 268
 Penalties taken by a rookie: Troy Mallette (1989–90) – 85
 Goaltending wins by a rookie: Henrik Lundqvist (2005–06) – 30
 Goaltending shutouts by a rookie: Lorne Chabot (1926–1927) – 10

Single-season records by nationality
Canadian
 Points by a Canadian: Jean Ratelle (1971–72) – 109
 Goals by a Canadian: Adam Graves (1993–94) – 52
 Assists by a Canadian: Mark Messier (1991–92) & Wayne Gretzky (1996–97) – 72
 Power play points by a Canadian: Marcel Dionne (1987–88) – 44
 Power play goals by a Canadian: Vic Hadfield (1971–72) – 23
 Power play assists by a Canadian: Rod Gilbert (1974–75) – 32
 Empty net goals by a Canadian: Mark Messier (1995–96) & Ryan Strome (2019–20) – 4
 Shots on goal by a Canadian: Phil Esposito (1976–77) – 344
 Goaltending wins by a Canadian: Eddie Giacomin (1968–69) – 38

American
 Points by an American: Brian Leetch (1991–92) – 102
 Goals by an American: Chris Kreider (2021–2022) – 52
 Power play goals by an American: Brian Leetch (1993–94) – 17
 Even strength points by an American: Mark Pavelich (1983–84) & Brian Leetch (1991–92) – 55
 Even strength goals by an American: Tony Granato (1988–89) – 28
 Even strength assists by an American: Brian Leetch (1991–92) – 44
 Short-handed points by an American: Kevin Hayes (2016–17) – 7
 Short-handed goals by an American: Cecil Dillon (1934–35) – 6
 Short-handed assists by an American: Kevin Hayes (2016–17) – 6
 Overtime goals by an American: 6 players  – 2
 Empty net goals by an American: Brandon Dubinsky (2010–11) – 5
 Plus/minus by an American: Brian Leetch (1996–97) – +31
 Shots on goal by an American: Brian Leetch (1993–94) – 328
 Penalty minutes by an American: Ed Hospodar (1980–81) – 214
 Penalties taken by an American: Tony Granato (1988–89) – 63
 Goaltending shutouts by an American: Mike Richter (1993–94) & Mike Dunham (2002–03) – 5
 Goaltending saves by an American: Mike Richter (1996–97) – 1784

European
 Assists by a European: Sergei Zubov (1993–94) – 77
 Power play points by a European: Jaromir Jagr (2005–06) – 52
 Power play assists by a European: Sergei Zubov (1993–94) – 40
 Even strength points by a European: Jaromir Jagr (2005–06) & Artemi Panarin (2019–20) – 71
 Even strength goals by a European: Marian Gaborik (2011–12) – 31
 Short-handed points by a European: Petr Nedved (2002–03), Vladislav Namestnikov (2018–19), & Mika Zibanejad (2019–20) – 5
 Short-handed goals by a European: Jan Erixon (1990–91), Esa Tikkanen (1993–94), Radek Dvorak (2001–02), Petr Nedved (2002–03), & Mika Zibanejad (2019–20) – 3
 Short-handed assists by a European: Sergei Nemchinov (1993–94) & Vladislav Namestnikov (2018–19) – 3
 Plus/minus by a European: Artemi Panarin (2019–20) – +36
 Penalty minutes by a European: Alexei Kovalev (1993–94) – 154
 Penalties taken by a European: Ulf Samuelsson (1996–97) – 57
 Goaltending wins by a European: Henrik Lundqvist (2011–12) – 39
 Goaltending shutouts by a European: Henrik Lundqvist (2010–11) – 11
 Goaltending saves by a European: Henrik Lundqvist (2009–10) – 1942

Czech
 Assists by a Czech: Jaromir Jagr (2005–06) – 69
 Power play assists by a Czech: Jaromir Jagr (2006–07) – 34
 Even strength goals by a Czech: Jaromir Jagr (2005–06) – 30
 Even strength assists by a Czech: Jaromir Jagr (2005–06) – 41
 Short-handed assists by a Czech: Radek Dvorak (1999–00, 2000–01, & 2002–03), Petr Nedved (2002–03), Marek Malik (2006–07), & Michal Rozsival (2006–07 & 2008–09) – 2
 Overtime goals by a Czech: Petr Nedved (2002–03) & Jaromir Jagr (2005–06) – 2
 Empty net goals by a Czech: Bobby Holik (2003–04) – 3
 Plus/minus by a Czech: Michal Rozsival (2005–06) – +35
 Penalty minutes by a Czech: Tomas Kloucek (2001–02) – 137
 Penalties taken by a Czech: Michal Rozsival (2006–07) – 45
 Goaltending wins by a Czech: Ondrej Pavelec (2017–18) – 4
 Goaltending shutouts by a Czech: Ondrej Pavelec (2017–18) – 1
 Goaltending saves by a Czech: Ondrej Pavelec (2017–18) – 464

Finn
 Points by a Finn: Reijo Ruotsalainen (1984–85) – 73
 Goals by a Finn: Reijo Ruotsalainen (1984–85) – 28
 Assists by a Finn: Reijo Ruotsalainen (1982–83) – 53
 Power play points by a Finn: Reijo Ruotsalainen (1984–85) – 30
 Power play goals by a Finn: Reijo Ruotsalainen (1984–85) – 10
 Power play assists by a Finn: Reijo Ruotsalainen (1984–85) – 20
 Even strength points by a Finn: Reijo Ruotsalainen (1982–83) – 45
 Even strength goals by a Finn: Reijo Ruotsalainen (1984–85) – 18
 Even strength assists by a Finn: Reijo Ruotsalainen (1982–83) – 34
 Short-handed points by a Finn: Esa Tikkanen (1993–94) – 4
 Short-handed assists by a Finn: Mikko Leinonen (1982–83 & 1983–84), Reijo Ruotsalainen (1984–85), Esa Tikkanen (1993–94), & Ville Nieminen (2005–06) – 1
 Game-winning goals by a Finn: Reijo Ruotsalainen (1982–83 & 1983–84) & Esa Tikkanen (1993–94) – 4
 Overtime goals by a Finn: Reijo Ruotsalainen (1983–84 & 1984–85), Olli Jokinen (2009–10), & Kaapo Kakko (2019–20) – 1
 Empty net goals by a Finn: Mikko Leinonen (1982–83) – 1
 Plus/minus by a Finn: Reijo Ruotsalainen (1982–83) – +27
 Shots on goal by a Finn: Reijo Ruotsalainen (1983–84) – 288
 Penalty minutes by a Finn: Esa Tikkanen (1993–94) – 114
 Penalties taken by a Finn: Esa Tikkanen (1993–94) – 49
 Goaltending wins by a Finn: Antti Raanta (2016–17) – 16
 Goaltending shutouts by a Finn: Antti Raanta (2016–17) – 4
 Goaltending saves by a Finn: Antti Raanta (2016–17) – 721

Russian
 Points by a Russian: Artemi Panarin (2019–20) – 95
 Goals by a Russian: Artemi Panarin (2019–20) – 32
 Power play points by a Russian: Sergei Zubov (1993–94) – 49
 Power play goals by a Russian: Sergei Zubov (1993–94) – 9
 Even strength goals by a Russian: Sergei Nemchinov (1991–92) – 28
 Short-handed goals by a Russian: Vladislav Namestnikov (2018–19) – 2
 Game-winning goals by a Russian: Alexei Kovalev (1995–96) – 7
 Overtime goals by a Russian: 5 players  – 1
 Empty net goals by a Russian: Artemi Panarin (2019–20) – 3
 Plus/minus by a Russian: Artemi Panarin (2019–20) – +36
 Shots on goal by a Russian: Sergei Zubov (1993–94) – 222
 Penalties taken by a Russian: Alexei Kovalev (1993–94) – 51
 Goaltending wins by a Russian: Alexandar Georgiev (2019–20) – 17
 Goaltending shutouts by a Russian: Alexandar Georgiev (2018–19) & (2019–20) – 2
 Goaltending saves by a Russian: Alexandar Georgiev (2019–20) – 967

Swede
 Points by a Swede: Tomas Sandstrom (1988–89) – 88
 Goals by a Swede: Mika Zibanejad (2019–20) – 41
 Assists by a Swede: Michael Nylander (2006–07) – 57
 Power play points by a Swede: Michael Nylander (2006–07) – 37
 Power play goals by a Swede: Mika Zibanejad (2019–20) – 15
 Power play assists by a Swede: Michael Nylander (2006–07)  –23
 Even strength points by a Swede: Michael Nylander (2005–06) – 62
 Even strength goals by a Swede: Anders Hedberg (1978–79) & Tomas Sandstrom (1986–87) – 27
 Short-handed assists by a Swede: Anders Hedberg (1978–79 & 1979–80), Jan Erixon (1984–85 & 1987–88), Niklas Sundstrom (1996–97), Jesper Fast (2017–18), & Mika Zibanejad (2019–20) – 2
 Game-winning goals by a Swede: Mika Zibanejad (2019–20) – 6
 Empty net goals by a Swede: Carl Hagelin (2013–14) & (2014–15), & Jesper Fast (2015–16) – 3
 Plus/minus by a Swede: Michael Nylander (2005–06) – +31
 Shots on goal by a Swede: Anders Hedberg (1980–81) – 243
 Penalty minutes by a Swede: Tomas Sandstrom (1988–89) – 148

See also
List of New York Rangers players
List of New York Rangers seasons
List of NHL statistical leaders
List of NHL players

ReferencesFootnotesCitations'''

External links
Hockey-Reference – New York Rangers Franchise Index
The Internet Hockey Database – New York Rangers
Official Site of the National Hockey League | NHL.com – Statistics

Records
National Hockey League statistical records
Rec